Coral diseases, comprising the diseases that affect corals, injure the living tissues and often result in the death of part or the whole of the colony. These diseases have been occurring more frequently in the twenty-first century as conditions become more stressful for many shallow-water corals. The pathogens causing the diseases include bacteria, fungi and protozoa, but it is not always possible to identify the pathogen involved.

Stress factors

Stony corals and soft corals are subject to disease in the same way as other organisms. This may not have been obvious in the past but is becoming increasingly apparent in the twenty-first century. The ill health is the result of the corals being subjected to increasing amounts of stress as the physical environment in which they live becomes less suited to their needs.

Corals live within a precise range of environmental conditions including water temperature, salinity and water quality. Variations outside the normal range of these parameters may make the corals less able to grow and reproduce successfully. Of themselves these variations may be insufficient to kill the corals, but they make them more susceptible to disease organisms. The main factor that causes stress to the corals is climate change, with an increase in sea temperatures, particularly affecting shallow-water corals in the tropics. One of the consequences of heat stress is that the coral expels its zooxanthellae and becomes bleached. The rise in sea temperature is also expected to increase the frequency and severity of tropical storms; these adversely affect corals through mechanical damage to reefs, through increased wave action, and through the stirring up and re-deposition of sediment. Other stress factors include increased pollution, increased ultraviolet radiation, and a reduction in the aragonite saturation of surface seawater that is connected with ocean acidification.  Although stressed corals are more susceptible to coral diseases, it is infectious organisms that actually cause these diseases. Pathogens so far identified include bacteria, fungi and protozoans.

Pathogens

Coral diseases mostly take the form of a narrow band of diseased tissue separating the living tissue from the exposed skeleton. The band moves across the surface of the colony at the rate of a few millimetres a day, leaving behind bare skeletal material that is rapidly colonized by algae.

Many of the diseases that affect corals are known by their most obvious symptoms such as black band disease, white pox and yellow-band disease. However, in many instances it has not been possible to identify the pathogens responsible for the disease and culture them in the laboratory; that the coral is sick and the tissue is necrotic is apparent, but whether the fungi or bacteria present caused the disease or merely fed on the already dying tissue is not clear. There is also a minute crab a millimetre or so wide which is often associated with diseased corals, but whether it introduces the disease or just moves in to consume the necrotic tissue is uncertain. Some of the bacteria found on diseased corals are terrestrial species that are not normally considered pathogenic. Further research has shown that viruses may be involved in white plague infections, the coral small circular single-stranded DNA (ssDNA) viruses being present in association with diseased tissue. Viruses in this group are known to cause disease in some plants and animals.

Distribution
Corals growing in the Caribbean Sea are particularly affected by disease, perhaps because of the limited water circulation and the density of the human population on the surrounding land masses. Disease is also present in the tropical Indo-Pacific, but it is not so widespread, perhaps because of the more dispersed locations of the reefs.

Bacterial communities
The bacterial communities in coral reefs are similar overall, but for each individual coral the bacterial community can differ greatly.  Coral is thought to follow the "Anna Karenina Hypothesis".  This means that healthy coral will have similar bacterial communities, but diseased corals that are infected with the same disease will have different bacterial communities.

Coral diseases
 Aspergillosis, caused by the fungus Aspergillus sydowii, affects Gorgonian soft corals commonly known as sea fans.
 White pox disease, caused by Serratia marcescens.
 Black necrosing syndrome, or Dark spots disease, probably fungal.
 Black band disease, probably caused by an assortment of photosynthetic and non-photosynthetic bacteria. 
 Brown band disease, or Red band disease, probably caused by protozoa (possibly Helicostoma nonatum) and cyanobacteria.
 Rapid Wasting, possibly caused by a fungus growing on areas damaged by the feeding of the Stoplight parrotfish.
 White band disease, the cause of this disease remains unknown.
 White plague, sometimes caused by the bacterium Aurantimonas coralicida.
 Skeletal eroding band, caused by the protozoan Halofolliculina corallasia.
 Yellow-band disease, possibly caused by an unidentified species of Vibrio.

References

Coral diseases